Perch of the Devil is a 1927 American silent drama film directed by King Baggot and starring Mae Busch, Pat O'Malley, and Jane Winton. It is based on the 1914 novel of the same title by Gertrude Atherton.

Cast

References

Bibliography
 Donald W. McCaffrey & Christopher P. Jacobs. Guide to the Silent Years of American Cinema. Greenwood Publishing, 1999.

External links
 

1927 films
1927 drama films
1920s English-language films
American silent feature films
Silent American drama films
American black-and-white films
Films directed by King Baggot
Universal Pictures films
1920s American films